Rumex vesicarius, also known as Ruby dock, or bladder dock, is a species of perennial flowering plant in the family Polygonaceae. According to Plants of the World Online, Rumex vesicarius is native to tropical and temperate Asia, Africa, and Western Australia. However, the Council of Heads of Australasian Herbaria asserts that within Australia it is naturalised in Western Australia, the Northern Territory, South Australia, Queensland and New South Wales.

Description 
It is an erect, succulent annual herb which grows to up about 60 cm high, and has triangular to ovate leaves which are truncate or cordate at the base and about 5–10 cm long, with entire margins. The stipules form an almost complete sheath around the stem which disintegrates. The flowers are green with a red tinge, and have six  perianth segments  with the inner three becoming enlarged  and papery when fruiting. The hard, red and reticulately veined fruit persist, giving rise to spectacular displays.

Etymology 
The specific epithet, vesicarius, derives from the Latin word, vesica,  meaning "bladder", to give an adjective  which describes the fruit of the plant as "inflated", "bladder-like".

References

External links
 
 
 Rumex vesicarius Occurrence data from GBIF
 

vesicarius
Taxa named by Carl Linnaeus
Plants described in 1753